The following is a list of the prominent or destructive earthquakes occurring in the Azores, or affecting the populace of the archipelago:

History

16th century
 1522 Vila Franca earthquake (22 October 1522)
 1591 Vila Franca earthquake (26 July 1591)

17th century
 1614 "Caída da Praia" earthquake (24 May 1614)

18th century
 1717 Graciosa earthquake
 1730 Graciosa earthquake (13 June 1730)
 1757 Mandado de Deus earthquake (9 July 1757)

19th century
 1800 Terceira earthquake (25 June 1800)
 1801 Terceira earthquake (26 January 1801)
 1816 North Atlantic earthquake (2 February 1816)
 1837 Graciosa earthquake (21 January 1837)
 1841 "Caída da Praia" earthquake (15 June 1841)
 1852 São Miguel earthquake (16 April 1852)

20th century
 1926 Horta earthquake (31 August 1926)
 1932 São Miguel earthquake (5 August 1932)
 1935 São Miguel earthquake (27 April 1935)
 1937 Azores earthquake (21 November 1937)
 1939 Azores earthquake (8 May 1939)
 1950 Praia da Vitória earthquake (29 December 1950)
 1952 São Miguel earthquake (26 June 1952)
 1958 Capelinhos earthquake (13 May 1958)
 1964 Rosais earthquake (21 February 1964)
 1973 Santa Luzia-Santo António earthquake (23 November 1973)
 1980 Azores Islands earthquake (1 January 1980)
 1998 Azores Islands earthquake (9 July 1998)

See also
List of earthquakes in Portugal

References
 
 
 
 
 
 

Azores-related lists
 Azores
Azores